Madison Avenue is a 1961 CinemaScope drama film directed by H. Bruce Humberstone, starring Dana Andrews, Jeanne Crain and Eleanor Parker. The film was completed in 1960 but was not released immediately. On April 13, 1961, Madison Avenue opened at the Rialto Cinema in London's West End for a two-week run. In late April, the film had a UK general release as part of a double bill with The Little Shepherd of Kingdom Come. The film was not seen in the United States until January 1962.

Plot
Clint Lorimer (Dana Andrews) works for an advertising company run by J.D. Jocelyn (Howard St. John). He is fired after Jocelyn finds out that Clint intends to form his own ad agency and steal a top client.

Out of spite, Clint hatches a scheme to turn a small business, Cloverleaf dairy, into a large and prosperous one through advertising. He approaches reporter Peggy Shannon (Jeanne Crain) to write articles about the dairy, then transforms girlfriend Anne Tremaine (Eleanor Parker), a demure colleague, into a glamorous, dynamic promotional whiz. Clint's next step is to turn Cloverleaf's mild-mannered owner, Harvey Ames (Eddie Albert), into a colorful personality to help publicize the business.

The plan comes apart, first when Peggy grows weary of being used professionally, then when Anne sees a reluctance in Clint to commit to a personal future together and leaves him. A chastised Clint comes back to his senses and decides to pursue a missile project as an account he can bring back to J.D.

Cast
 Dana Andrews as Clint Lorimer
 Eleanor Parker as Anne Tremaine
 Jeanne Crain as Peggy Shannon
 Eddie Albert as Harvey Holt Ames
 Howard St. John as J.D. Jocelyn
 Henry Daniell as Stipe
 Kathleen Freeman as Miss Thelma Haley
 David White as Brock
 Betti Andrews as Katie Olsen

See also
 List of American films of 1961

References

External links
 
 
 
 

1961 films
1961 romantic drama films
20th Century Fox films
CinemaScope films
American black-and-white films
American business films
American romantic drama films
Films about advertising
Films based on American novels
Films directed by H. Bruce Humberstone
Films scored by Harry Sukman
Films set in New York City
1960s English-language films
1960s American films